The following lists events that happened in 1949 in Iceland.

Incumbents
President – Sveinn Björnsson
Prime Minister – Stefán Jóhann Stefánsson, Ólafur Thors

Events

Births

21 January – Kristín Marja Baldursdóttir, writer
18 February – Ingibjörg Pálmadóttir, politician.
3 March – Hreinn Halldórsson, track and field athlete
9 April – Guðni Ágústsson, politician
23 June – Ragnheiður Ríkharðsdóttir, politician.
22 August – Þórarinn Eldjárn, writer
16 October – Ásta Ragnheiður Jóhannesdóttir, politician

Deaths

References

 
1940s in Iceland
Iceland
Iceland
Years of the 20th century in Iceland